Lucy Sawere Nkya (born 10 October 1952) is a Tanzanian CCM politician and Member of Parliament for Morogoro South East constituency since 2010.

References

1952 births
Living people
Tanzanian medical doctors
Chama Cha Mapinduzi MPs
Tanzanian MPs 2000–2005
Tanzanian MPs 2005–2010
Tanzanian MPs 2010–2015
Weruweru Secondary School alumni
Kilakala Secondary School alumni
Muhimbili University of Health and Allied Sciences alumni
University of Nairobi alumni